Cardinal Winning Secondary School is a Roman Catholic co-educational secondary school, located in the Tollcross area of Glasgow.

It caters for secondary aged children with Additional Learning Needs.

It opened in June 2011 following the closures of St Aidan's School and St Joan of Arc School.

It is named after Cardinal Winning, the first Roman Catholic Cardinal of Glasgow, who died in 2001.

References

Educational institutions established in 2011
Catholic secondary schools in Glasgow
2011 establishments in Scotland